Air Time: The Best of Glass Tiger is Glass Tiger's first Greatest Hits album. It contains all of their charting singles, both in their native Canada, and the United States from their first three studio albums. The compilation also includes two unreleased recordings: "After the Dance" and "Touch of Your Hand", this last song was released as a single: it entered in the Canadian charts and peaked at number 34 in January 1994.

Air Time: The Best of Glass Tiger was certified gold in Canada in 2005.

Critical reception 
AllMusic's Michael Sutton said the album "collects choice cuts from a group that is usually remembered for one song", drawing vocal comparisons of the band's singer Alan Frew to George Michael in "Don't Forget Me (When I'm Gone)" and musically similarities in "Animal Heart" with Def Leppard. However, he admits that the compilation "should've stopped with their second LP" because "by their third record, the group had become nearly unlistenable".

Track listing

Certifications

References 

1993 greatest hits albums
Glass Tiger albums
Capitol Records compilation albums